Leyton East was a parliamentary constituency in the Municipal Borough of Leyton, then part of Essex but now in Greater London.

It returned one Member of Parliament (MP) to the House of Commons of the Parliament of the United Kingdom, elected by the first past the post system.

Boundaries

The Urban District of Leyton wards of Cann Hall, Grove Green, Harrow Green, Leytonstone, and Wanstead Slip.

History
The constituency was created for the 1918 general election, and abolished for the 1950 general election.

Members of Parliament

Elections

Election in the 1910s

Elections in the 1920s

Elections in the 1930s

Elections in the 1940s

References

 

Parliamentary constituencies in London (historic)
Constituencies of the Parliament of the United Kingdom established in 1918
Constituencies of the Parliament of the United Kingdom disestablished in 1950
Leyton